Sophie Maierhofer (born 9 August 1996) is an Austrian footballer who plays as a right-back for ÖFB-Frauenliga club Sturm Graz and the Austria national team.

She was on the Austria squad at UEFA Women's Euro 2017.

References

External links
 

1996 births
Living people
Austrian women's footballers
Austria women's international footballers
Frauen-Bundesliga players
ÖFB-Frauenliga players
Kansas Jayhawks women's soccer players
SV Werder Bremen (women) players
Sophie Maierhofer
Aston Villa W.F.C. players
MSV Duisburg (women) players
SK Sturm Graz (women) players
Women's association football fullbacks
Austrian expatriate women's footballers
Expatriate women's soccer players in the United States
Austrian expatriate sportspeople in the United States
Expatriate women's footballers in Germany
Austrian expatriate sportspeople in Germany
Expatriate women's footballers in Iceland
Expatriate women's footballers in England
Austrian expatriate sportspeople in England
UEFA Women's Euro 2017 players